Lilián Leal Ramírez (born 23 February 1975 in Mexico City) is a Mexican former synchronized swimmer who competed in the 1996 Summer Olympics and in the 2000 Summer Olympics.

References

1975 births
Living people
Mexican synchronized swimmers
Swimmers from Mexico City
Olympic synchronized swimmers of Mexico
Synchronized swimmers at the 1996 Summer Olympics
Synchronized swimmers at the 2000 Summer Olympics
Pan American Games medalists in synchronized swimming
Pan American Games bronze medalists for Mexico
Synchronized swimmers at the 1995 Pan American Games
Medalists at the 1995 Pan American Games